The Command and Staff College is the Pakistan Army's staff college for mid-career army officers. As the Army Staff College it was initially established in 1905 at Deolali (near Bombay) and later shifted to Quetta in 1907, Baluchistan, British India, now in Pakistan. It has been the alma mater of many renowned soldiers.
On the partition of India  those staff not staying in Pakistan moved to Wellington Cantonment and formed the Defence Services Staff College

Before the establishment of the college, Indian Army officers had to travel to UK to study at the Staff College, Camberley, but the number of places there was insufficient for the needs of the Army. The problem was exacerbated by the reorganization of the Indian Army under Lord Kitchener, the Commander-in-Chief of the Army in India which created more staff appointments. Kitchener proposed a college similar to Camberley was set up in India and this was accepted. The college was opened in the Musketeer School  in  Deolali and moved to Quetta when the buildings for it were completed in 1907.

It is the oldest military institution in Pakistan.

The college was previously affiliated with the University of Balochistan but is now affiliated with the National Defence University (NDU) along with other staff and war colleges of the Pakistan Navy and the Pakistan Air Force.

Location 
The Command and Staff College is located at Quetta, the provincial capital of Pakistan's Balochistan Province. It is situated at the entrance to the Urak valley. To the north, south-east and south-west stand the Takatu, Murdarghar, and Chiltan mountain ranges, rising to heights of 930–1020 metres (10-11,000 ft). Lower than the Murdarghar and closer to the Staff College, is the mountain known as the "Sleeping Beauty", which takes its name from its uncanny resemblance to a lady in repose. She is at her best when the first winter snow throws her in sharp contrast against the skyline.

Motto and emblem 
A scroll runs through the swords on which are inscribed the Persian words Pir Sho Biyamooz – Saadi. Its literal translation is Grow old learning – Saadi, who was a famous Persian poet. When paraphrased, it means, "Go on learning and acquiring knowledge until you are old." Until 1950 the college used the Latin motto "By the pen as much as by the sword." The old emblem included an owl, commonly known as a symbol of learning and wisdom, perched on crossed swords, in several variants. In 1979 the owl was replaced by an epithet more appropriate for an Islamic country, over the swords.  literally means "Read!", but it is a reference to the 96th surah of the Qur'an.

Organisation 
The college is headed by a commandant who is a major general, and is organised into two wings, namely, the Headquarters Wing and the Instructional Wing. The Instructional Wing, headed by a Chief Instructor (a Brigadier), is the mainstay of the college. The Senior Instructor Training (a Colonel) is responsible for curricular management and programming of all related activities, he is assisted General Staff Officer Grade 2, training 1. The faculty of research and doctrinal studies, commonly known as FORADS, is headed by a director of the rank of Colonel or Brigadier with four research sections and one IT and media wing, each being managed by a Directing Staff / Colonel member.

The Instructional Wing has four instructional divisions, each under a Senior Instructor of the rank of Colonel. The Headquarters Wing provides administrative support to the Instructional Wing.

It is a well-reputed seat of learning for warfare and allied staff aspects with a student body of approximately 400 officers, which include nearly 30 officers from over 23 allied nations. The Allied Officers form an important segment of the college community, adding color and giving a cosmopolitan touch to life at the college. There are about 52 members on the faculty at any one time making an instructor to student ratio of about 1:8, which is amongst the highest in the world.

Objectives 
At the end of the year, the graduate should:
 Possess an insight into the employment of forces in tactical operations under the battlefield environment.
 Be able to handle operational and administrative staff functions and prepare his outfit to perform its peace and wartime roles.
 Be able to discern the place of tactical plans within the ambit of operational strategy and joint services warfare.
 Be able to apply leadership and management skills within the socio-religious setting.
 Be able to research issues of professional import.
 Be able to comprehend international and regional political order.
 Develop the skill to identify the central issue of military problems, and present options for their resolution.

Selection criteria 
The Pakistani officers who attend the course must meet the following requirements:
 Rank/Service: Majors with 8–12 years service.
 Courses: respective arm/service Mid Career Course and Promotion Examinations.
 Selection Criteria: based on merit list of a competitive examination, service record and professional standing.
 Civil: preferably Bachelor of Arts/Science to qualify for the award of Master of Science degree in Art and Science of Warfare from the National Defence University, Islamabad.

Notable alumni 
Field Marshals
 The 1st Earl Wavell 
The 1st Viscount Montgomery of Alamein 
 The 1st Viscount Slim (United Kingdom)
Sir Claude Auchinleck
 Ayub Khan (Pakistan)
 Sam Manekshaw (India)
 KM Cariappa (India)
 Thomas Blamey (Australia)
Generals
 Musa Khan, Yahya Khan, Gul Hassan Khan, Tikka Khan, Rahimuddin Khan, Muhammad Zia-ul-Haq, Mirza Aslam Beg, Asif Nawaz and Pervez Musharraf who all, later, became Pakistan Army's Chiefs or Chairmen Joint Chiefs
 General M. A. G. Osmani, Supreme Commander of Bangladesh Forces during the Bangladesh Liberation War
Lieutenant General Ziaur Rahman, Bir Uttom, former President and 2nd Chief of Army Staff of Bangladesh, and commander of the Z Force and BDF Sector 1 and Sector 11 in the Bangladesh Liberation War. For his role as a company commander in the Indo-Pakistani War of 1965 at Khemkaran Sector he was awarded the Hilal-i-Jur'at.
 Major General Raza Muhammad
 Brigadier General Daniel Austin
General Tan Sri Mohammad Ghazali Che Mat, Chief of Malaysian Armed Forces from 1985 to 1987

The Citadel
The Citadel is a publication of the Command and Staff College, Quetta. It provides a forum for the expression of thoughts on  doctrinal and conceptual issues and other matters of professional  import, or those related to national security and interest. It was  instituted in 1984, as an exclusively professional magazine, on the  directions of General Muhammad Zia-ul-Haq, then President of  Pakistan and Chief of the Army Staff. The name denotes both the  territorial and ideological moorings. Prior to this, articles of such  nature were published (regularly since 1947) in the college year-book, known at various times as Owl Pie (1921), The Owl (1922–78) and The  Review (1979–83).

Clubs 
Associated clubs include:

Shikar (Shooting) Club
There is good shooting club within motoring distance of the college. Shikar trips are occasionally organized by the club.

Saddle Club
The college has 30 ponies for officers interested in riding. Membership of the club is also open to ladies and children above eight years of age. Interested officers are expected to bring their own riding kit. Traditionally, the club is extensively patronized by the allied officers community.

Polo
Polo is played with enthusiasm, even if sometimes without matching skills, and the season extends from April to November.

Al-Nisa Club
The college traditionally runs a very active ladies club which is known for its colourful and interesting activities. Meetings are normally held once a fortnight.

Allied Officers Cell
This cell functions under the Senior Instructor Training and deals with all matters related to guidance and welfare of Allied Officers. A member of the faculty and a Pakistani student officer is assigned to each Allied Officer to make his stay pleasant and comfortable.

Barki Park 

A number of outdoor facilities are provided inside the college campus and in the foothills of the mountains. Barki Park not only provides entertainment for children but also a soothing relief for the students and their families, especially with traditional live Rabab music every weekend. The entertainment facilities include a pizza and coffee shop, skating arena, zip line, rock climbing arena, lush green lawns with water oscillators, various shades of all weather roses and a lot more.
Uplifting of the park, Project Green, was outsourced to Mr. Saadat Nabi Sherwani and Co. Project Green has been completed with a lot of Horticultural innovations by the designer.

Campus 
Libraries
The Command and Staff College has a Main and a Fiction Library. The Fiction Library has a good selection of weekly and monthly magazines in addition to books that offer a variety of light readings. The Main Library houses books, mainly professional in nature. A large number of international newspapers and magazines on professional and general subjects are also available in the Main Library.

Museum
The college has a small museum, which was inaugurated on 16 May 1979. This Museum houses various items of interest and historical value pertaining to the college.

Officers Mess
The Officers Mess is lodged in a building with an interior decor in traditional style. Most of the formal functions are held in the Mess. The Mess premises are also used for hosting private parties in accordance with the Mess Instructions. A snack bar, next to the Mess, functions in the evening. It was reconstructed in 1939.

Children's Schooling
The college runs an English-medium secondary School and College, the Iqra Army Public School and College, for the benefit of children of the student officers and the faculty.

List of Commandants

Notable instructors 
 General Joyanto Nath Chaudhuri Chief of Army Staff of the Indian Army from 1962 to 1966 and the Military Governor of Hyderabad State from 1948 to 1949.
 Field Marshal Bernard Montgomery.
 General Qamar Javed Bajwa

See also 
 PAF Air War College
 Pakistan Naval War College

References

Bibliography 
 The Staff College, Quetta. The First Fifty Years of The Staff College Quetta, 1906–1955. (Quetta: The Staff College, 1962). 80 pages.

External links 
 
 

Training formations of Pakistan Army
Pakistan Command and Staff College
Universities and colleges in Quetta District
Public universities and colleges in Balochistan, Pakistan
Military of British India
Quetta
Training establishments of the British Army
Pakistan Command and Staff College